Leyla Hanim (d. 1848) was a 19th century Turkish woman poet.

Biography
Hanim was born (date unknown) in Constantinople (now Istanbul). Her father was Moralızâde Hâmid Efendi and her mother Hadîce Hanım. Hanim was educated by the father of poet Mehmed Fuad Pasha, Mehmed Fuad Pasha, who was also a poet and writer. Hanim experienced a brief marriage which resulted in divorce. She died in 1848. As a member of the Mevlevi Order, she is buried at the Galata Mevlevihanesi.

After Hanim's divorce, she started writing poetry collected in a diwan. She experimented with various forms of poetry. After her father died she wrote odes in the Iran tradition of ghazal.

References

Sources
 Mehmed Zihnî Efendi. In: Meşahir ün-nisa. 1877 (in Turkish). 
 Sami Frashëri. Kâmûsü’l-A’lâm’a Göre 19.Yüzyılın Sonunda Trabzon. 1877 (in Turkish)

1848 deaths
Writers from Istanbul
19th-century women writers
Turkish women poets
Turkish women writers
19th-century poets from the Ottoman Empire
Year of birth missing